The Norlands (also known as the Israel Washburn Homestead) is a historic building on Norlands Road in Livermore, Maine, United States.  It was owned by Israel Washburn and his descendants.

History 
The Gothic Revival-style house was built in 1821 and added to the National Register of Historic Places in 1969. The house is now operated as part of the Washburn-Norlands Living History Center, a 19th-century period farm with living-history demonstrations.  The buildings include the Norlands mansion, a mid-19th-century period schoolhouse, a library with displays about the Washburn family, a meeting house, a farmer's cottage, and a barn with farm animals. The barn and farmer's cottage burned down in April 2008 but the Farmer's Cottage was rebuilt and reopened in early 2011. As of July 29, 2012, the barn has yet to be rebuilt.

Fire

A fire started on April 28, 2008, at the Washburn-Norlands Living History Center. The fire was likely caused by a lamp tipping over and falling into hay, setting it alight. Volunteer firefighters, whom had prepared in advance for a fire in this scenario, put out the fire with assistance from 10 other fire departments. Langhorne Washburn, the only living descendant born at the Norlands, said to the Sun Journal: "...Thank God Norlands didn’t burn. I would like to commend (the firefighters) on their efficiency." in preventing the fire. , rebuilding of the farm has begun.

Bibliography 
Remarkable Americans: The Washburn Family by Kerck Kelsey
The Rise and Fall of William Drew Washburn by Kerck Kelsey
J.R. Dodge edits from personal site visit, July 29, 2012

See also 
Ethel Wilson Gammon, founder and first executive director of the Washburn-Norlands Living History Center

References

External links
 Washburn-Norlands Living History Center

Houses completed in 1821
Houses on the National Register of Historic Places in Maine
Houses in Androscoggin County, Maine
Museums in Androscoggin County, Maine
Living museums in Maine
Historic districts on the National Register of Historic Places in Maine
National Register of Historic Places in Androscoggin County, Maine